The Atada class is a class of coastal minesweepers of the Japan Maritime Self-Defense Force.

Development 
During the Pacific War, a large number of mines were laid in the waters near Japan by both Japan and the United States, which greatly hindered shipping including coastal areas at the end of the war, so the need to deal with this was urgent. For this reason, the minesweeping force was maintained even while the Imperial Japanese Navy was dismantled after the surrender of Japan, and was taken over by the 2nd Ministry of Demobilization on 1 December 1945. After that, minesweepers were absorbed by the Japan Coast Guard, which was established on 1 August 1952, and transferred to the Coastal Security Force.

Immediately after its inauguration, the guards have been aiming for domestic production of minesweepers, and in 1953, the first year after their inauguration, the construction of three medium-sized minesweepers (MSCs) was included. These three vessels have the characteristics of actual ship experiments, and two systems will be adopted for both the ship type and the main engine. Of these, two vessels adopted the round hull type. On the other hand, it was JDS Yashiro that adopted the square hull form.

Ships in the class

Citations 

Ships built in Japan
Minesweepers of the Japan Maritime Self-Defense Force